Riccia canaliculata is a species of liverwort belonging to the family Ricciaceae.

It is native to Europe and Northern America.

References

Ricciaceae